Francesco Mulè (3 December 1926 – 4 November 1984), was an Italian actor, voice actor and television and radio personality. He appeared in 74 films between 1953 and 1979.

Born in Rome, the son of composer Giuseppe Mulè, he studied at the Silvio d’Amico Academy of Dramatic Arts and debuted in the stage company held by Renzo Ricci. He got a large popularity thanks to his radio and television appearances as a presenter and a comedian. He was also active as a character actor in films and on stage. Mulè was the Italian voice of Yogi Bear.

Selected filmography

 Empty Eyes (1953) - Marcucci, Fernando's colleague
 The Walk (1953) - Un insegnante
 Camilla (1954) - Il pappagallo in auto (uncredited)
 The Bachelor (1956) - Cosimo
 Souvenir d'Italie (1957) - Lawyer Andrea Mazzoni
 Susanna Whipped Cream (1957) - Un altro ladro
 Femmine tre volte (1957) - Presidente squadra baseball
 Camping (1958) - Don Clemente
 Toto in the Moon (1958) - Il vigile urbano
 Girls for the Summer (1958) - L'albergatore
 Totò, Eva e il pennello proibito (1959) - Don Alonzo
 The Friend of the Jaguar (1959) - Ugo, l'orefice
 Le signore (1960) - Dentist Filippo
 Il carro armato dell'8 settembre (1960)
 Totò, Peppino e...la dolce vita (1961) - Guglielmo, un signore eccentrico
 Sua Eccellenza si fermò a mangiare (1961) - Il commissario
 Hercules in the Valley of Woe (1961)
 La ragazza di mille mesi (1961) - Amleto il Cameriere
 Cronache del '22 (1961)
 Psycosissimo (1962) - Arturo Michelotti
 I Don Giovanni della Costa Azzurra (1962) - Baldassarre Giaconia
 Appuntamento in Riviera (1962) - Marengoni
 The Four Musketeers (1963) - Louis XIII
 The Shortest Day (1963) - (uncredited)
 Adultero lui, adultera lei (1963) - Il commissario
 La pupa (1963)
 Follie d'estate (1963) - Altro tipo in spiaggia
 Il treno del sabato (1964) - Mario Mancini
 White Voices (1964) - The Trappist Monk
 I marziani hanno 12 mani (1964) - Ambasciatore Austriaco
 Il Gaucho (1964) - Fiorini
 Corpse for the Lady (1964) - Augusto Ferrante
 Latin Lovers (1965) - L'avvocato (segment "L'irreparabile")
 Spiaggia libera (1966) - Falso Prete
 A Maiden for a Prince (1966) - Don Daniel
 Dr. Goldfoot and the Girl Bombs (1966) - Colonel Doug Benson
 Operation White Shark (1966)
 Mano di velluto (1966)
 Come rubare un quintale di diamanti in Russia (1967) - Groeber
 On My Way to the Crusades, I Met a Girl Who... (1967) - Rienzi
 Ric e Gian alla conquista del West (1967) - Maggiore Jefferson
 The Biggest Bundle of Them All (1968) - Antonio Tozzi
 Danger: Diabolik (1968) - Crematoria Operator (uncredited)
 The Most Beautiful Couple in the World (1968) - Commendatore Gennaroni
 Il marito è mio e l'ammazzo quando mi pare (1968) - Duke Ostanzo
 House of Cards (1968) - Policeman at Trevi Fountain
 Vacanze sulla Costa Smeralda (1968) - Inspector Antonio Grassu
 Il terribile ispettore (1969) - Agapito Trigallo
 Il ragazzo che sorride (1969) - Undertaker's establishment owner
 The Secret of Santa Vittoria (1969) - Francucci
 Diary of a Telephone Operator (1969) - L'Esaminatore
 Pensiero d'amore (1969) - Ser Domenico Meniconi
 Pensando a te (1969) - Undertaker
 Story of a Woman (1970) - Manzetti
 The Divorce (1970) - Friar Leone
 When Women Had Tails (1970) - Uto
 Nel giorno del Signore (1970) - Papa Leone X
 Lacrime d'amore (1970) - Her father
 Riuscirà il nostro eroe a ritrovare il più grande diamante del mondo? (1971) - Gran Capo
 Riuscirà l'avvocato Franco Benenato a sconfiggere il suo acerrimo nemico il pretore Ciccio De Ingras? (1971) - Onorevole Megrini
 When Women Lost Their Tails (1972) - Uto
 Cause for Divorce (1972) - Judge
 Il terrore con gli occhi storti (1972) - Questore
 Meo Patacca (1972) - Roman Prince
 4 caporali e ½ e un colonnello tutto d'un pezzo (1973)
 Il lumacone (1974) - Pietro
 Calore in provincia (1975) - Calogero Lentini
 L'infermiera di mio padre (1976)
 Confessions of a Lady Cop (1976) - Alfredo Amicucci, Gianna's Father
 Voto di castità (1976) - Teodoro
 Il pomicione (1976) - Raffaele Moscone
 Gli uccisori (1977)
 Orazi e curiazi 3-2 (1977) - Ango
 Kakkientruppen (1977) - Il cuoco
 Malabestia (1978) - Giubileo
 La supplente va in città (1979) - Davide Romiti - the father

References

External links

1926 births
1984 deaths
Italian male film actors
Male actors from Rome
Accademia Nazionale di Arte Drammatica Silvio D'Amico alumni
20th-century Italian male actors
Italian male television actors
Italian male stage actors
Italian male voice actors
Italian radio presenters
Italian television presenters